Qualifications for Women's artistic gymnastic competitions at the 2008 Summer Olympics was held at the Beijing National Indoor Stadium on August 10. The results of the qualification determined the qualifiers to the finals: eight teams in the team final, 24 gymnasts in the all-around final, and eight gymnasts in each of four apparatus finals.

The competition was divided into four sessions, at 10:00am, 1:30pm, 5:00pm and 8:00pm.

Qualification results

Finalists

Teams qualified

All-around qualifiers

Only two gymnasts per country may advance to a final. The following gymnasts scored high enough to qualify, but did not do so because two gymnasts from their country had already qualified ahead of them:
  60.800 (6th place)
  60.450 (9th place)
  60.425 (10th place)
  60.425 (11th place)
  59.000 (16th place)
  57.450 (29th place)
  57.250 (30th place)

The eventual final qualifier placed 31st overall in the all-around.

Vault event final (EF) qualifiers

Uneven bars EF qualifiers

Balance beam EF qualifiers

Only two gymnasts per country may advance to an event final. The following gymnasts scored high enough to qualify, but did not do so because two gymnasts from their country had already qualified ahead of them:

  15.950 (4th place)
  15.775 (8th place)
  15.550 (9th place)
  15.500 (10th place)
  15.500 (11th place)

The eventual final two qualifiers, Dragoi (ROU) and Tsurumi (JPN), had the 12th and 13th highest balance beam score overall during qualification.

Floor EF qualifiers

References

 Official scores
 Team Qualification Results
 All Around Qualification Results
 Floor Qualification Results
 Vault Qualification Results
 UB Qualification results
 BB Qualification Results
 Vault Qualification Results

Gymnastics at the 2008 Summer Olympics
2008
2008 in women's gymnastics